Bemowo is a district of Warsaw located in the western part of the city. Its territory covers the western belt of the former district of Wola, which was incorporated to Warsaw in the year 1951. The name of the district derives from the surname of General Józef Bem.

Neighbourhoods within the district 
 Lotnisko
 Fort Radiowo
 Boernerowo
 Bemowo Lotnisko
 Fort Bema
 Groty
 Górce
 Chrzanów
 Jelonki Północne
 Jelonki Południowe

Twin towns – Sister cities
Bemowo is twinned with:
 Óbuda-Békásmegyer (Budapest), Hungary

References

External links
The official website of Bemowo
A local info-website
A local Internet newspaper for Bemowo
Bemowo Pictures - Amateur movie group from Bemowo 

 
1951 establishments in Poland